The 1958–59 Eintracht Frankfurt season was the 59th season in the club's football history. In 1958–59 the club played in the Oberliga Süd, the top tier of German football. It was the club's 14th season in the Oberliga Süd.

The season ended up with Eintracht winning the German championship for the first time, beating their local rivals Kickers Offenbach in the final match.

Matches

Legend

Friendlies

Oberliga

League fixtures and results

League table

Championship round

Group stage

Final

DFB-Pokal / SFV-Pokal

Squad

Squad and statistics

|}

Transfers

In:

Out:

See also
 1959 German football championship

Notes

Sources

External links
 Official English Eintracht website 
 German archive site
 1958–59 Oberliga Süd season at Fussballdaten.de 

1958-59
Eintracht Frankfurt
German football championship-winning seasons